The M75 grenade (English: kashikara, Serbian Latin: kašikara, Serbian Cyrillic: кашикара) is a Yugoslav hand grenade, efficient in trenches, forests and bunkers. The grenade consists of a body, an explosive charge and "mouse trap" style fuse mechanism, all contained in a plastic transportation can.

The core contains 3,000 steel balls with a diameter of 2.5–3 mm with an effective killing radius of 12–18 m, and a  casualty radius of 30–54 m. The explosive charge is 36–38 grams of plastic explosive. The fuse, named "bušon" in Serbian, has a delay time of 3 to 4.4 seconds. Its name comes from the Turkish word for a spoon, "kašika". In American English, the lever of the grenade is colloquially known as the "spoon". The M-75 hand grenade was also produced in Macedonia, where it is designated M-93.

Use by criminal gangs in England, Sweden and Belgium
A shipment of leftover grenades of this type (and the M-93) from the Yugoslav Wars was taken to Sweden and sold for as little as 20 kronor to organised criminals and street gangs, who have been using them in numerous attacks since 2008 (ongoing as of 2018).

Others were used by criminal families in England, including an attack that killed two police officers in 2012.

In 2018, two M75 hand grenades were used in Deurne (Antwerp). The attack is possibly linked to a drug war in Antwerp.

In 2021, one M75 hand grenade was used in Pakrac, Croatia. Milorad Arsenić, an earlier member of Serbian paramilitary forces in Croatia attacked three employees of Croatian power company HEP that come to disconnect his power for unpaid bills.

References

External links
 BR-M75 Hand Grenade at Military & Police Training
 The M75 at Balkan war history.com

Fragmentation grenades
Hand grenades of Yugoslavia
Crime in Sweden
Crime in Manchester